Ben Rubin is an American Magic: The Gathering player. Rubin played his first Pro Tour in Los Angeles at the age of 15, making it to the finals of the tournament, where he lost to David Price. He is the only player who has won two Masters tournaments. Ben Rubin also made the Top 8 of four Pro Tours and six Grand Prixs, winning two of the Grand Prix. In 2008 he was inducted into the Magic: The Gathering Hall of Fame. Despite having not attended many Pro Tours for several years, in 2015 Rubin returned to the game by playing at Pro Tour Dragons of Tarkir.

Accomplishments

References

Living people
American Magic: The Gathering players
People from San Diego
Year of birth missing (living people)